Cossington is a village and civil parish close to Woolavington and  north of Bridgwater, in the Sedgemoor district in Somerset, England. The village lies on the north side of the Polden Hills.

History

It was probably part of the ancient Polden estate of Glastonbury Abbey. The abbey retained an interest as chief lord of the manor until 1508. The parish of Cossington was part of the Whitley Hundred.

Cossington railway station was a station on the Bridgwater branch of the Somerset and Dorset Joint Railway, which opened in 1890 and closed in 1952.

Cossington had a Penny Post service under Bridgwater in 1830. The post office closed in March 2007.

Governance

The parish council has responsibility for local issues, including setting an annual precept (local rate) to cover the council's operating costs and producing annual accounts for public scrutiny. The parish council evaluates local planning applications and works with the local police, district council officers, and neighbourhood watch groups on matters of crime, security, and traffic. The parish council's role also includes initiating projects for the maintenance and repair of parish facilities, as well as consulting with the district council on the maintenance, repair, and improvement of highways, drainage, footpaths, public transport, and street cleaning. Conservation matters (including trees and listed buildings) and environmental issues are also the responsibility of the council.

The village falls within the Non-metropolitan district of Sedgemoor, which was formed on 1 April 1974 under the Local Government Act 1972, having previously been part of Bridgwater Rural District, which is responsible for local planning and building control, local roads, council housing, environmental health, markets and fairs, refuse collection and recycling, cemeteries and crematoria, leisure services, parks, and tourism.

Somerset County Council is responsible for running the largest and most expensive local services such as education, social services, libraries, main roads, public transport, policing and fire services, trading standards, waste disposal and strategic planning.

It is also part of the Bridgwater and West Somerset county constituency represented in the House of Commons of the Parliament of the United Kingdom. It elects one Member of Parliament (MP) by the first past the post system of election, and was part of the South West England constituency of the European Parliament prior to Britain leaving the European Union in January 2020, which elected seven MEPs using the d'Hondt method of party-list proportional representation.

Religious sites

The church is dedicated to St Mary and dates from the 13th century; it underwent extensive renovation in 1900. It has been designated by English Heritage as a Grade II* listed building.

References

External links

Somerset Levels
Villages in Sedgemoor
Civil parishes in Somerset